General elections were held in India in four phases between 20 April and 10 May 2004. Over 670 million people were eligible to vote, electing 543 members of the 14th Lok Sabha. Seven states also held assembly elections to elect state governments. They were the first elections fully carried out with electronic voting machines.

On 13 May the ruling Bharatiya Janata Party (BJP), the lead party of the National Democratic Alliance conceded defeat. The Indian National Congress, which had governed India for all but five years from independence until 1996, returned to power after a record eight years out of office.  It was able to put together a comfortable majority of more than 335 members out of 543 with the help of its allies. The 335 members included both the Congress-led United Progressive Alliance, the governing coalition formed after the election, as well as external support from the Bahujan Samaj Party (BSP), Samajwadi Party (SP), Kerala Congress (KC) and the Left Front.

After facing criticism from her own party and from the country Congress President Sonia Gandhi asked the 22nd Finance Minister Manmohan Singh, an economist, to head the new government. Singh had previously served in the Congress government of Prime Minister P. V. Narasimha Rao in the early 1990s, when he was seen as one of the architects of India's first economic liberalisation plan, which staved off an impending monetary crisis. Despite the fact that Singh had never won a Lok Sabha seat, his considerable goodwill and Sonia Gandhi's nomination won him the support of the UPA allies and the Left Front.

The elections saw the evolution of a two-party system with political competition primarily concentrated between the UPA and NDA.

Background
Prime Minister Atal Bihari Vajpayee had recommended premature dissolution of the 13th Lok Sabha (in accordance with a provision of the Constitution) to pave the way for early elections apparently in view of the recent good showing of the BJP in the Assembly elections in four states.

Organisation
The election dates for the parliamentary elections were:
20 April – 141 constituencies
26 April – 137 constituencies
5 May – 83 constituencies
10 May – 182 constituencies

Counting began simultaneously on 13 May. Over 370 million of the 675 million eligible citizens voted, with election violence claiming 48 lives, less than half the number killed during the 1999 election. The Indian elections were held in phases in order to maintain law and order. A few states considered sensitive areas required deployment of the armed forces. The average enrolment of voters in each constituency is 1.2 million, although the largest constituency has 3.1 million.

The Election Commission of India is responsible for deciding the dates and conducting elections according to constitutional provisions. The Election Commission employed more than a million electronic voting machines for these elections.

According to the magazine India Today, 115.62 billion rupees were expected to have been spent in campaigning for the elections by all political parties combined. Most of the money was spent on the people involved in the election. The Election Commission limited poll expenses to Rs. 2.5 million per constituency. Thus, the actual spending is expected to have been approximately ten times the limit. About 6.5 billion rupees are estimated to have been spent on mobilising 150,000 vehicles. About a billion rupees are estimated to have been spent on helicopters and aircraft.

Pre-poll alliances
In these elections, compared to all the Lok Sabha elections of the 1990s, the battle was more of a head-to-head contest in the sense that there was no viable third front alternative. Largely the contest was between BJP and its allies on one hand and Congress and its allies on the other. The situation did, however, show large regional differences.

The BJP fought the elections as part of the National Democratic Alliance (NDA), although some of its seat-sharing agreements were made with strong regional parties outside of the NDA such as Telugu Desam Party (TDP) in Andhra Pradesh and All India Anna Dravida Munnetra Kazhagam (AIADMK) in Tamil Nadu.

Ahead of the elections there were attempts to form a Congress-led national level joint opposition front. In the end, an agreement could not be reached, but on regional level alliances between Congress and regional parties were made in several states. This was the first time that Congress contested with that type of alliances in a parliamentary election.

The left parties, most notably the Communist Party of India (Marxist) and the Communist Party of India, contested on their own in their strongholds West Bengal, Tripura and Kerala, confronting both Congress and NDA forces. In several other states, such as Punjab and Andhra Pradesh, they took part in seat sharings with Congress. In Tamil Nadu they were part of the Dravida Munnetra Kazhagam (DMK)-led Democratic Progressive Alliance.

Two parties refused to go along with either Congress or BJP, Bahujan Samaj Party and Samajwadi Party. Both are based in Uttar Pradesh, the largest state of India (in terms of population). Congress made several attempts to form alliances with them, but in vain. Many believed that they would become the 'spoilers' that would rob Congress of an electoral victory. The result was a four-cornered contest in UP, which didn't really hurt or benefit Congress or BJP significantly.

Forecast and campaigns
Most analysts believed the NDA would win the elections. This assessment was also supported by opinion polls. The economy had shown steady growth in the last few months and the disinvestment of government owned production units (a continuation of India's liberalisation policies initiated in the early 1990s) had been on track. The Foreign Exchange Reserves of India stood at more than US$100 billion (7th largest in the world and a record for India). The service sector had also generated a lot of jobs. The party was supposed to have been riding on a wave of the so-called "feel good factor", typified by its promotional campaign "India Shining".

In the past, BJP has largely been seen as a hard-line Hindu party with close ties with the Hindu organisation the Rashtriya Swayamsevak Sangh (RSS). Over the years, the party has slightly distanced itself from its Hindutva policies, a change that is being questioned after the party's poor showing in the elections. These elections were marked by the campaign's emphasis on economic gains. From the last few elections, BJP had realised that its voter base had reached a ceiling and had concentrated on pre-poll rather than post-poll alliances. The foreign origin of Sonia Gandhi also constituted part of the NDA's campaign.

Opinion polls

Exit polls

Results

Region-wise results

By states and territories

States

Territories

Analysis

Though pre-poll predictions were for an overwhelming majority for the BJP, the exit polls (immediately after the elections and before the counting began) predicted a hung parliament. However, even the exit polls could only indicate the general trend and nowhere close to the final figures. There is also the general perception that as soon as the BJP started realising that events might not proceed entirely in its favour, it changed the focus of its campaign from India Shining to issues of stability. The Congress, who was regarded as "old-fashioned" by the ruling BJP, was largely backed by poor, rural, lower-caste and minority voters that did not participate in the economic boom of previous years that created a wealthy middle class and thus achieved its overwhelming victory.

Impact
The rout of the ruling parties in the states of Tamil Nadu and Kerala in the general elections led to calls for the dissolution of the governments of these states.

The stock market (Bombay Stock Exchange) fell in the week prior to the announcement of the results due to fears of an unstable coalition. As soon as counting began, however, it became clear that the Congress coalition was headed for a sizeable lead over the NDA and the market surged, only to crash the following day when the left parties, whose support would be required for government formation, announced that it was their intention to do away with the disinvestment ministry. Following this, Manmohan Singh, the Prime Minister (in office 2004–14) and the prime architect of the economic liberalisation of the early 1990s, hurried to reassure investors that the new government would strive to create a business-friendly climate.

Events
13 May - The Congress and allies win a plurality of seats in the Lok Sabha (219 seats against 188 for the BJP).
13 May - Counting of votes in the parliamentary elections begins.
11 May - Congress wins the Assembly elections in Andhra Pradesh by 2/3 majority.
10 May - The fourth and final phase of elections comes to an end. Results will come out for 542 of the 543 parliament seats with elections to be held again in Chhapra.
5 May - Third phase of polling comes to an end with the ruling coalition government gaining seats according to exit polls but still off the victory target. Reports of booth capturing in Chhapra capture headlines.
26 April - Second phase of elections sees 55-60% polling. This is the final phase for assembly elections. Polling covers 136 parliamentary constituencies in 11 states. The share market starts to crash as it becomes evident that the NDA government may find it hard to come back to power—raising doubts about the continuation of economic reforms initiated by the NDA government.
22 April - Tripura, where polling was delayed because of a local holiday, votes for its two MPs. A turnout of close to 60% is reported, despite calls for abstention made by separatist militants.
20 April - The first phase of the vote is held, with average turnouts of between 50% and 55%. Voting is reported as brisk, and the day unfolds relatively smoothly, albeit with some glitches reported with the electronic voting machines. Isolated violent incidents take place in Kashmir, Jammu, Manipur, and Jharkhand.
8 April - The NDA's top leaders meet in New Delhi to adopt its manifesto for the elections, "Agenda for Development and Good Governance".
7 April - Ram Jethmalani says he will contest the elections against Prime Minister Vajpayee as an independent candidate from Lucknow. He claims he will be supported by the Congress and some other parties.
6 April - The BJP and the All India Anna Dravida Munnetra Kazhagam (AIADMK) tell the Election Commission that they will not stop raising the issue of the foreign origin of Congress president Sonia Gandhi.
4 April - A First Information Report is lodged against external affairs minister Yashwant Sinha for alleged violation of election code of conduct during a poll meeting in Ranchi. Besides Sinha, FIRs were lodged against three other BJP leaders who participated in the meeting.

See also
2004 elections in India
Election Commission of India

Further reading
Shastri, Sandeep, K.C. Suri & Yogendra Yadav (2009) (ed.). Electoral Politics in Indian States : Lok Sabha Elections in 2004 and Beyond, New Delhi : Oxford University Press,

References

External links
Election Commission of India
Parliament of India
Interactive map at rediff.com
Report from Mumbai, Gujarat during 2004 election

 
2004 elections in India
India
General elections in India